Coleophora siccifolia is a moth of the family Coleophoridae. It is found in most of Europe.

Coleophora species have narrow blunt to pointed forewings and a weakly defined tornus. The hindwings are narrow-elongate and very long-fringed. The upper surfaces have neither a discal spot nor transverse lines. Each abdomen segment of the abdomen has paired patches of tiny spines which show through the scales. The resting position is horizontal with the front end raised and the cilia give the hind tip a frayed and upturned look if the wings are rolled around the body. C. siccifolia characteristics include head light greyish-ochreous. Antennae white, ringed with fuscous, basal joint pale greyish-ochreous. Posterior tarsi grey-whitish. Forewings brownish-grey, somewhat shining. Hindwings rather dark grey.

The larvae feed on Alnus, Betula lutea, Betula pubescens, Carpinus betulus, Crataegus laevigata, Malus domestica, Sorbus aucuparia and Tilia species. They create a tubular leaf case. It is almost barrel-shaped, with a large leaf fragment that, while withering, folds itself around the tube. Before a larva leaves a mine to start a new one, it often detaches the upper epidermis by cutting along the sides of the mine. The detached epidermis either falls off or dries and curls. Full-grown larvae can be found in August in Great Britain and in October in continental Europe.

References

External links

 Bestimmungshilfe für die in Europa nachgewiesenen Schmetterlingsarten

siccifolia
Moths described in 1856
Moths of Europe
Taxa named by Henry Tibbats Stainton